Gabriel "Gabe" Allen Nevins (born August 26, 1991) is an actor who is best known for starring in Gus Van Sant’s 2007 film Paranoid Park.

Career 
Nevins was cast as the lead of Paranoid Park even though he was auditioning to be a skateboarding extra. The film premiered at the 2007 Cannes Film Festival as one of the 22 films in the competition, and won the special 60th anniversary prize. He was cast as an extra in Wendy and Lucy (2008), Rachel (2010) and Some Days Are Better Than Others (2011). In 2010, he starred in the short film Will.

The photographer Nick Haymes published a collection of photos of Nevins, titled Gabe, in March 2012. It featured photos of him that Haymes had taken since he first met Nevins shortly after the release of Paranoid Park. It was criticized by Vice as being exploitive.

Personal life 
Nevins was born to Erich and Sharon Nevins. His father passed away in August 2000.

He attended Rex Putnam High School, but eventually spiraled out of control and has struggled with mental illness and drug addiction and also homelessness. But, through help from family and friends Gabe has been able to get his life back together and is still occasionally seen with a skate board at some of his favorite skate parks.

Filmography

References

External links

1991 births
Living people
American male film actors
American male child actors